Metehan Mert (born 1 May 1999) is a Turkish professional footballer who plays as a centre-back for Turkish club Gençlerbirliği.

Career
Mert is a youth product of the academies of Ankarakartalspor, and Gençlerbirliği. Mert signed his first professional contract with Gençlerbirliği in December 2018, and made his first senior appearance in a 2–1 Turkish Cup win over Hatayspor on 4 December 2018. He soon after went on a series of loans with their affiliate club, Hacettepe, in the TFF Second League. Mert returned to Gençlerbirliği, and made his professional debut with them in a 4–0 Süper Lig loss to Göztepe on 19 January 2021.

References

External links

1999 births
Living people
People from Ankara Province
Turkish footballers
Association football defenders
Süper Lig players
Gençlerbirliği S.K. footballers
Hacettepe S.K. footballers